Spencer is a city in Oklahoma County, Oklahoma, United States, and a part of the  Oklahoma City metropolitan area. The population was 3,912 at the 2010 census.

Established in 1903, the City of Spencer is a historic community located just east of the North Canadian River. Spencer is approximately ten miles from downtown Oklahoma City and borders the cities of Nicoma Park to the east and Midwest City to the south.

Contributing to the cultural fabric of Spencer are the Spencer Chamber of Commerce, the Facebook page-Whats going on in Spencer Oklahoma, Spencer Senior Center, Spencer Parks Board and the Spencer Historical Society.

History
The region where Spencer was developed was opened to settlement in the Land Run of 1889. Louis F. and Henry W. Kramer, businessmen originally from Spencer County, Indiana, first arrived in Guthrie in 1889 and then moved to Oklahoma City.

Originally an agricultural area, Spencer grew after World War II with the nearby General Motors Assembly Plant and Tinker Air Force Base offering employment.

On January 20, 1982, seven children were killed by the explosion of a water heater in the cafeteria of the city's Star Elementary School.   

CPT Riley L. Pitts, the first black commissioned officer to receive the Medal of Honor, is buried in Spencer's Hillcrest Memory Gardens. Captain Pitts was a graduate of Wichita University (now Wichita State University.)

Geography
Spencer is located at  (35.507760, -97.370662).

Demographics

As of the census of 2000, there were 3,746 people, 1,420 households, and 1,002 families residing in the city. The population density was 701.0 people per square mile (270.9/km). There were 1,567 housing units at an average density of 293.3 per square mile (113.3/km). The racial makeup of the city was 39.94% White, 51.82% African American, 2.83% Native American, 0.35% Asian, 0.05% Pacific Islander, 0.51% from other races, and 4.51% from two or more races. Hispanic or Latino of any race were 2.32% of the population.

There were 1,420 households, out of which 29.4% had children under the age of 18 living with them, 47.0% were married couples living together, 17.8% had a female householder with no husband present, and 29.4% were non-families. 26.1% of all households were made up of individuals, and 11.5% had someone living alone who was 65 years of age or older. The average household size was 2.59 and the average family size was 3.09.

In the city, the population was spread out, with 28.8% under the age of 18, 7.8% from 18 to 24, 24.2% from 25 to 44, 24.1% from 45 to 64, and 15.1% who were 65 years of age or older. The median age was 38 years. For every 100 females, there were 94.6 males. For every 100 females age 18 and over, there were 88.4 males.

The median income for a household in the city was $31,116, and the median income for a family was $37,470. Males had a median income of $30,199 versus $21,153 for females. The per capita income for the city was $18,242. About 15.0% of families and 19.1% of the population were below the poverty line, including 33.3% of those under age 18 and 11.2% of those age 65 or over.

Dunjee School
Dundjee School was all-Black school that was built in 1934 and opened as a segregated school in 1935 serving black students in Spencer.  The school is named after Black Oklahoma City civil rights leader Roscoe Dunjee. The school served 1st through 12th-grade students and according to Dr. Donnie Nero the school was nurturing, and enriching, but also tough. “Those teachers those educators made sure that we focused on being the best that we possibly could be so there wasn't a lot of time for foolishness or time to waste,” said Nero. The school featured some of the best and brightest black teachers, such as civil rights leader Clara Luper, and the Rev. W.B. Parker, pastor of nearby St. James Baptist Church. Dunjee school closed in 1972, devastating the community of Spencer.

The residents of the Dunjee area had long suffered at the hand of segregation in Oklahoma. Before 1963 it was part of the Choctaw school system. After years of substandard support from the City of Choctaw, they fought to be integrated into the Oklahoma City school system and won. However, in 1972 the school board closed all Dunjee schools and began bussing as part of the mandated laws of de-segregation. The community was stunned.

Because of de-segregation Dunjee closed its doors in 1972, a move that in many eyes damaged the Spencer community. When the school's doors shut for good, "it devastated this community," said Theotis Payne. In 2012 a fire causing $250,000 in damage made the school uninhabitable.

Controversy
In 2013, the City of Spencer came under fire after several officials affiliated with the city were accused of embezzling funds; this was perpetrated by three previous employees of the city. An estimated $6,200 in funds were missing from the payroll system, and the three employees were shortly charged with embezzlement

References

External links
 City of Spencer official website

Cities in Oklahoma County, Oklahoma
Oklahoma City metropolitan area